These are the Oricon number one albums of 1996, per the Oricon Albums Chart.

Chart history

References

1996 record charts
Lists of number-one albums in Japan
1996 in Japanese music